Submarine U-475 Black Widow was a Soviet Navy submarine of the Cold war period, which is now in private hands.
It is currently moored at Strood, on the River Medway, in South-East England.

Background
The Soviet Project 641 class submarines (known to the West by their NATO reporting name of ) was a class of conventionally powered patrol/attack submarines. 
Some 74 were built by the Soviet Navy between 1957 and 1983 as well as 17 others for the Libyan, Cuban and Indian navies.

Service history
Black Widow was built at Sudomekh shipyard in Leningrad and commissioned in 1967. It was based at Riga and served with the Soviet Baltic Fleet before being used as a training vessel for crews from overseas who would be operating Foxtrot-class subs in their own navies. It was decommissioned in 1994 and sold.

Museum ship

After passing into private hands, and under the name U-475 Black Widow it was moored at Long's Wharf near the Thames Barrier in England where it was open to the public as a museum ship. In 1998 it was moved to Folkestone, where it was again opened to the public. In 2004 it was moved to her present location, in a state of disrepair, and is currently awaiting restoration.

After the invasion of Ukraine by the Russian Federation, U-475 began to fly the Ukrainian national flag as a sign of clear support for Ukraine in the conflict.

Naming
The submarine is currently referred to as Foxtrot B-39 U-475 Black Widow.  The B- designation stands for Bolshaya (Large), and was used by the Soviet Navy during the Cold War era. The B-39 designation also suggests a vessel in the Soviet Pacific Fleet; Baltic Fleet vessels carried numbers in the 200s. 
The name Black Widow and the designation U-475 were invented for the boat by the new owners; Soviet submarines were not generally named, the U- designation was not used by the Soviets and none of the Foxtrots known carried the number -475.

In Soviet service it was actually known as B-49 and served in the Northern Fleet until November 1974 when it was reassigned to the Baltic.

References

External links
 U-475 Black Widow website

Foxtrot-class submarines
Ships built in the Soviet Union
1966 ships
Cold War submarines of the Soviet Union
Museum ships in the United Kingdom